Kevin Dillon (23 December 1924 – 7 October 1984) was  a former Australian rules footballer who played with Richmond in the Victorian Football League (VFL).

Notes

External links 		
		
		
		
		
		
		
		
1924 births		
1984 deaths		
Australian rules footballers from Victoria (Australia)		
Richmond Football Club players
University Blacks Football Club players
Kew Football Club players